Supervivientes 2017: Perdidos en Honduras, is the twelfth season of the show Supervivientes and the sixteenth season of Survivor to air in Spain and it was broadcast on Telecinco in early 2017. Jorge Javier Vázquez will be the main host at the central studio in Madrid, with Lara Álvarez co-hosting from the island, and Sandra Barneda hosting a side debate of the program. The crew fled to Honduras on March 25. The first contestant was announced one day prior.

Cast
The first official contestant to be confirmed was actor Bigote Arrocet, on March 24. On April 15, all the contestants were spotted at the airport traveling to Honduras. The full line-up is:

Nominations

Notes
: Earth tribe has the privilege of being exempt from nominations.
: Paola was sent to dead zone. She becomes a zombie.
: As the winners of the immunity challenge, Bibi and Eliad were given the power to name a nominee.
: Lucía decided to leave the reality after her fake elimination, avoiding to face nomination against Paola in the dead zone.
: As the winners of the immunity challenge, Alejandro and Eliad were given the power to name a nominee.
: Janet was sent to dead zone. Janet was officially evicted by a vote to eliminate. Paola stays as a zombie.
: As the winners of the immunity challenge, Alejandro and Kiko were given the power to name a nominee.
: Bibi had to quit the game due to medical reasons. To replace her the eliminated contestant from this week, Janet, would come back to the game. Janet returns to the game as a new zombie. Paola resuscitated and reintegrated with the rest of the contestants.
: Raquel was sent to dead zone. Raquel was officially evicted by a vote to eliminate. Janet stays as a zombie.
: As the winners of the immunity challenge, Alejandro and Iván were given the power to name a nominee. As there was a tie between Alba and Leticia in the Hell's team, Iván broke it nominating Leticia.
: Leticia was sent to dead zone. Janet was officially evicted by a vote to eliminate. Leticia stays as a zombie.
: As the winners of the immunity challenge, José Luis and Kiko were given the power to name a nominee.
: Paola was sent to dead zone. Leticia was officially evicted by a vote to eliminate. There was no more zombies.
: Paola re-joined the group and she was exempt from nominations.
: As the winner of the immunity challenge, Iván was given the power to name a nominee.
: Edmundo was sent to the Exile Island.
: As the winner of the immunity challenge, Iván was given the power to name a nominee.
: Kiko was sent to the Exile Island. Edmundo was officially evicted by a vote to eliminate. Kiko stays on Exile Island.
: Alba lost her right to nominate in a task and she gave her nominations to Paola randomly.
: As the winner of the immunity challenge, Alejandro was given the power to name a nominee.
: Gloria was sent to the Exile Island and she was officially evicted by a vote to eliminate. Kiko stays on Exile Island.
: Juan Miguel received 2 extra points in the nominations in a task.
: As the winner of the immunity challenge, Alejandro was given the power to name a nominee.
: Paola was sent to the Exile Island and she was officially evicted by a vote to eliminate. Kiko stays on Exile Island.
: Laura was automatically nominated in a task. Juan Miguel lost his right to nominate in a task and he gave his nominations to Alejandro randomly.
: As the winner of the immunity challenge, Alejandro was given the power to name a nominee.
: Juan Miguel was sent to the Exile Island and he was officially evicted by a vote to eliminate. Kiko stays on Exile Island.
: As the winner of the immunity challenge, Laura was given the power to name a nominee.
: Alejandro and Iván were sent to the Exile Island and Alejandro and Kiko were officially evicted by a vote to save. Iván survived and returned to the competition.
: As the winner of the immunity challenge, José Luis was given the power to name a nominee.
: José Luis won the last immunity challenge and went through the final vote. Alba and Laura were nominated.

Tribes

Ratings

"Galas"

"Conexión Honduras"

"Tierra de Nadie"

External links

Survivor Spain seasons